Tezu is a census town and the headquarters of Lohit district in the Indian state of Arunachal Pradesh. It is the fifth largest town in Arunachal Pradesh and one of its most developed.

Tezu is one of the 60 constituencies of Legislative Assembly of Arunachal Pradesh. The current MLA (May 2019) of Tezu constituency is Karikho Kri. He is an independent candidate.

Geography
It has an average elevation of 185 metres (606 feet). It is situated on the bank of River Lohit.

Agriculture
The major agricultural products are mustard, ginger and oranges.

Climate

Transport

The recently constructed airport at Tezu will be the first civilian airport of Arunachal Pradesh. On Sep 22, 2017 the first successful test flight was conducted. Other nearest airports are at Mohanbari (154 km) and Guwahati (Lokpriya Gopinath Bordoloi International Airport).  Tezu is linked with the adjacent state Assam by road. Arunachal Pradesh State Transport Services (APSTS) and other privately owned vehicles provide seamless connectivity to Assam. Most of the vehicles provide connectivity to Tinsukia, Assam. The nearest railway station is at Tinsukia (NTSK) which is linked to major parts of country like Guwahati, Delhi, Kolkata, Bangalore, etc.

227 km Murkongselek-Pasighat-Tezu-Rupai line is being undertake as a strategic project. As part of this project, a proposal to connect Tezu through broadgauge line from Murkongselek via Pasighat and extending up to Parshuram Kund was made. A preliminary engineering-traffic survey for this track has been completed, and land is being acquired as of 2020.

The newly constructed Lohit Bridge (2.9 KM) over the Lohit River at Alobarighat has also eased the connectivity of Tezu and other nearby towns with Assam. This bridge has helped Tezu in getting directly connected to Guwahati through bus service.

The strategic 2 lane  Dr. Bhupen Hazarika Setu or Dhola-Sadiya bridge (9.15 KM) on Brahmaputra, which has reduced travel time between Assam and Arunachal Pradesh by four hours, has been operational since May 26, 2017.It is very crucial for defence purposes and is the longest river bridge in India.

Demographics
As per 2011 Indian census, Tezu had a population of 18,184 of which 9,743 are males while 8,441 are females. Population of children with age 0-6 is 2104 which is 11.57% of total population of Tezu. Tezu has an average literacy rate of 83.98%, higher than the state average of 65.38% and national average of 74.04%. Male literacy rate is around 88.29%, and female literacy rate is 78.94%. The female sex ratio is 866 against state average of 938. Moreover, child sex ratio in Tezu is around 968 compared to the state average of 972.

Hindus consists around 75.57% of the total population while Muslim, Christian and Sikh consists 7.43%, 8.24% and 0.29% respectively. Buddhism is around 5.41% and other religions are 2.91% of the total population.

Languages

According to Census 2011, Bengali is Spoken by  
3,373 people, Nepali at 3,371 people, Bhojpuri by 2,197 people, Hindi at 1,884,  Mismi by 1,790 people and Assamese at 1,561.

Tibetan diaspora 

Tezu also has a sizeable population of Tibetan community of about 1500 mostly residing in a settlement called by local name as Lama Camp, Tibetans settled here since the 1960s after fleeing Chinese persecution in their homeland Tibet, till date they have maintained their own custom and tradition, they have built monasteries, health centres, nursing homes, schools etc. with funds from the government and other sources.

Media and communications
State-owned All India Radio has a local station in Tezu which transmits various programs of mass interest. Also, the local TV channel - Matai Communication broadcasts local news, shows and programs.

Local cultural festivals 
The major Mishmi God is Ringyajabmalu and the major Mishmi festival is known as Tamladu puja. It is celebrated each year on 15 February. People from all communities and all walks of life are invited to join in the celebrations. The Holy Parshuram Kund is also nearby and thousands of Hindu pilgrims from all over India, and also from neighbouring countries, come to take a holy dip and wash away the sins of millions of births. This is accompanied with a fair at Tezu and takes place every year during the month of January.

Tamladu, the main festival of the Digaru and Miju Mishmi community is celebrated with much gaiety at Tezu and all over the Lohit district. Other festivals such as Mopin (Adi festival), Sangken (Khamti & Singhpo tribe), Reh (Idu Mishmi festival), and Losar (Monpa festival) are also celebrated.

Other than this, Durga Puja (Dusshera), Kali Puja, Ganesh Chaturthi, etc. are also celebrated with much gaiety.

Educational institutions 

 Government Higher School, Tezu
 Government Secondary School, Tezu
 Kendriya Vidyalaya, Tezu
 Krick & Boury Memorial School
 Indira Gandhi Government College
 Teacher's Training Institute (B.Ed College)
 Vivekananda Kendriya Vidyalaya, Tezu
 VKV Tafragam, Tezu
 Arun Jyoti school
 Lohit Valley School
 Government secondary school Telluliang

References

External links
http://friends-of-ziro.blogspot.com

Cities and towns in Lohit district